The 2002–03 Mighty Ducks of Anaheim season was the Ducks' tenth season in franchise history. The club qualified for the Stanley Cup Finals for the first time in franchise history, falling to the New Jersey Devils.

Off season
After missing the play offs for the third time in a row, Anaheim made drastic changes in the summer, off the ice as well on the ice. GM Pierre Gauthier was fired after failing to acquire forwards to provide the necessary goal scoring. Brian Murray was promoted to the position of General Manager and made a lot of changes. He hired their farm teams head coach Mike Babcock who stated in his first ever press conference that his team would work very hard and relentlessly. Murray's first big move at the 2002 Draft was a trade with the New Jersey Devils : he traded defenceman Oleg Tverdovsky and forward Jeff Friesen in exchange for Petr Sykora, rookies Mike Commodore and Jean-Francois Damphousse, who saw some brief action last season as back-up goalie to Martin Brodeur. Additional free agent signings were veterans Adam Oates, Frederik Olausson and Jason Krog. Three rookies got regular roster spots : Kurt Sauer, Stanislav Chistov and Alexei Smirnov. Martin Gerber became the Mighty Ducks new back up goalie, having had a lot of experience as a starter in the Swedish league.

Regular season
On February 12, 2003, Mike Leclerc scored just ten seconds into the overtime period to give the Mighty Ducks a 4–3 home win over the Calgary Flames. It would prove to be the fastest overtime goal scored during the 2002–03 regular season.

Final standings

Playoffs

Conference Quarterfinals
In what was a very large upset, the seventh-seed Mighty Ducks took a first-round series from the number-two seed and defending Stanley Cup champions, the Detroit Red Wings. The Mighty Ducks swept the Red Wings in four games to get revenge from 1997 and 1999, where the Mighty Ducks were swept by the Red Wings. In Game 1 of the series, when the game went to overtime, the sellout crowd at Joe Louis Arena thought the Wings had won the game thanks to a Luc Robitaille shot at 9:21. Some of the Detroit players had even left for the dressing room. However, after going to the video review, it was concluded Robitaille's shot ricocheted off the crossbar and the post, and the players were brought back to resume the game. Later, at 3:18 into the third overtime period, Paul Kariya scored the goal that would clinch a 2–1 win for Anaheim and a one-game lead in the series. Anaheim goaltender Jean-Sebastien Giguere faced 64 shots in game one. In Game 2, Anaheim came back from a 2–1 deficit by scoring two goals in the third period.

The Mighty Ducks won Game 3 at the Arrowhead Pond of Anaheim, 2–1, to push the Red Wings to the brink of elimination. The Mighty Ducks then won Game 4, a 3–2 overtime victory, with Steve Rucchin delivering the decisive goal 6:53 into overtime. The Red Wings became only the second defending Stanley Cup champions to be swept the following year in a four-game opening series.

Conference semifinals
The series opened at American Airlines Center in Dallas, where the heavily favored Stars and underdog Ducks engaged in an epic battle that took over 140 minutes and four overtimes to decide before Anaheim's Petr Sykora scored the game-winner 47 seconds into the fifth overtime, winning the game for the Ducks, 4–3. Dallas goaltender Marty Turco saw 54 shots while Anaheim's Jean-Sebastien Giguere saw 63. Game 2 saw another game tied after 60 minutes, but this time, Anaheim needed only 1:44 to win the game in the first overtime, 3–2, on a goal by Mike Leclerc. Dallas, much like Detroit in its first-round series against the Ducks, faced a 2–0 deficit headed to Anaheim.

Game 3 at Arrowhead Pond of Anaheim was a must-win for the Stars, and they came through, winning the game, 2–1, getting two clutch goals from Jere Lehtinen. But the Ducks refused to let the Stars back in the series, winning Game 4, 1–0, behind a 28-save shutout from Giguere. Not wanting to be eliminated in front of their home fans, a motivated Dallas team captured Game 5, 4–1. Unfortunately for the Stars, their bid to take the series to a Game 7 was denied when they were edged in Game 6, 4–3.

Conference finals
In Game 1, Petr Sykora scored at 8:06 into double-overtime in a 1–0 Mighty Ducks victory. It was the Mighty Ducks' second shutout of the playoffs. Jean-Sebastien Giguere turned in a stellar performance in net for Anaheim, stopping all 39 shots he faced. For Game 2, the Wild played Dwayne Roloson instead of Manny Fernandez in net. As in Game 1, it was another shutout for Giguere as the Mighty Ducks won the game 2–0. Both goals were short-handed, and Giguere stopped all 24 shots he faced, making him 63-for-63 in the series. In Game 3, Giguere continued his goal-tending excellence, stopping all 35 shots he faced in a 4–0 Mighty Ducks victory that pushed the Wild to the brink of elimination. Giguere had now stopped the first 98 shots he saw in the series. In Game 4, The Mighty Ducks won the game, 2–1. Both goals came from Adam Oates, and the Mighty Ducks headed to their first Stanley Cup Final. The only good news for the Wild was that they avoided a fourth consecutive shutout, as Andrew Brunette scored the first Minnesota goal of the series. Still, Giguere was 122-for-123 in the series, a robust .992 save percentage.

Stanley Cup Finals

Schedule and results

Regular season

|- align="center" bgcolor="#CCFFCC"
|1||W||October 10, 2002||4–3 || align="left"| @ St. Louis Blues ||1–0–0–0 || 
|- align="center" bgcolor="#FFBBBB"
|2||L||October 11, 2002||2–4 || align="left"| @ Dallas Stars ||1–1–0–0 || 
|- align="center" bgcolor="#FFBBBB"
|3||L||October 13, 2002||2–4 || align="left"| Detroit Red Wings ||1–2–0–0 || 
|- align="center" bgcolor="#FFBBBB"
|4||L||October 16, 2002||2–4 || align="left"| Los Angeles Kings ||1–3–0–0 || 
|- align="center"
|5||T||October 18, 2002||2–2 OT || align="left"| Vancouver Canucks ||1–3–1–0 || 
|- align="center" bgcolor="#CCFFCC"
|6||W||October 20, 2002||3–2 OT || align="left"| Colorado Avalanche ||2–3–1–0 || 
|- align="center"
|7||T||October 24, 2002||2–2 OT || align="left"| @ Vancouver Canucks ||2–3–2–0 || 
|- align="center" bgcolor="#FFBBBB"
|8||L||October 26, 2002||3–4 || align="left"| @ Edmonton Oilers ||2–4–2–0 || 
|- align="center" bgcolor="#FFBBBB"
|9||L||October 28, 2002||2–5 || align="left"| @ Toronto Maple Leafs ||2–5–2–0 || 
|- align="center"
|10||T||October 29, 2002||2–2 OT || align="left"| @ Montreal Canadiens ||2–5–3–0 || 
|- align="center" bgcolor="#CCFFCC"
|11||W||October 31, 2002||4–1 || align="left"| @ Boston Bruins ||3–5–3–0 || 
|-

|- align="center" bgcolor="#FFBBBB"
|12||L||November 3, 2002||3–4 || align="left"| San Jose Sharks ||3–6–3–0 || 
|- align="center" bgcolor="#CCFFCC"
|13||W||November 6, 2002||2–1 || align="left"| Nashville Predators ||4–6–3–0 || 
|- align="center" bgcolor="#CCFFCC"
|14||W||November 8, 2002||3–2 OT || align="left"| @ Colorado Avalanche ||5–6–3–0 || 
|- align="center" bgcolor="#CCFFCC"
|15||W||November 10, 2002||1–0 || align="left"| Minnesota Wild ||6–6–3–0 || 
|- align="center" bgcolor="#FF6F6F"
|16||OTL||November 12, 2002||2–3 OT || align="left"| @ New Jersey Devils ||6–6–3–1 || 
|- align="center" bgcolor="#CCFFCC"
|17||W||November 14, 2002||3–2 || align="left"| @ Columbus Blue Jackets ||7–6–3–1 || 
|- align="center" bgcolor="#FF6F6F"
|18||OTL||November 15, 2002||1–2 OT || align="left"| @ Detroit Red Wings ||7–6–3–2 || 
|- align="center" bgcolor="#CCFFCC"
|19||W||November 17, 2002||5–1 || align="left"| @ Atlanta Thrashers ||8–6–3–2 || 
|- align="center" bgcolor="#FF6F6F"
|20||OTL||November 19, 2002||2–3 OT || align="left"| @ New York Rangers ||8–6–3–3 || 
|- align="center" bgcolor="#FFBBBB"
|21||L||November 22, 2002||0–4 || align="left"| Dallas Stars ||8–7–3–3 || 
|- align="center"
|22||T||November 24, 2002||4–4 OT || align="left"| Florida Panthers ||8–7–4–3 || 
|- align="center"
|23||T||November 27, 2002||2–2 OT || align="left"| Phoenix Coyotes ||8–7–5–3 || 
|- align="center"
|24||T||November 29, 2002||2–2 OT || align="left"| Los Angeles Kings ||8–7–6–3 || 
|-

|- align="center" bgcolor="#CCFFCC"
|25||W||December 1, 2002||3–2 || align="left"| Chicago Blackhawks ||9–7–6–3 || 
|- align="center" bgcolor="#FFBBBB"
|26||L||December 3, 2002||1–2 || align="left"| @ Detroit Red Wings ||9–8–6–3 || 
|- align="center" bgcolor="#FFBBBB"
|27||L||December 4, 2002||0–4 || align="left"| @ Buffalo Sabres ||9–9–6–3 || 
|- align="center" bgcolor="#CCFFCC"
|28||W||December 6, 2002||4–3 || align="left"| @ Chicago Blackhawks ||10–9–6–3 || 
|- align="center" bgcolor="#CCFFCC"
|29||W||December 8, 2002||3–0 || align="left"| Nashville Predators ||11–9–6–3 || 
|- align="center" bgcolor="#CCFFCC"
|30||W||December 11, 2002||3–0 || align="left"| Washington Capitals ||12–9–6–3 || 
|- align="center" bgcolor="#CCFFCC"
|31||W||December 15, 2002||5–0 || align="left"| Pittsburgh Penguins ||13–9–6–3 || 
|- align="center" bgcolor="#CCFFCC"
|32||W||December 18, 2002||5–2 || align="left"| St. Louis Blues ||14–9–6–3 || 
|- align="center" bgcolor="#FFBBBB"
|33||L||December 19, 2002||4–5 || align="left"| @ Los Angeles Kings ||14–10–6–3 || 
|- align="center" bgcolor="#CCFFCC"
|34||W||December 22, 2002||4–0 || align="left"| Phoenix Coyotes ||15–10–6–3 || 
|- align="center" bgcolor="#FFBBBB"
|35||L||December 26, 2002||1–4 || align="left"| @ San Jose Sharks ||15–11–6–3 || 
|- align="center" bgcolor="#FFBBBB"
|36||L||December 28, 2002||3–7 || align="left"| @ Vancouver Canucks ||15–12–6–3 || 
|- align="center" bgcolor="#FFBBBB"
|37||L||December 29, 2002||2–4 || align="left"| @ Calgary Flames ||15–13–6–3 || 
|- align="center" bgcolor="#FFBBBB"
|38||L||December 31, 2002||1–4 || align="left"| @ Minnesota Wild ||15–14–6–3 || 
|-

|- align="center" bgcolor="#FFBBBB"
|39||L||January 3, 2003||0–1 || align="left"| Philadelphia Flyers ||15–15–6–3 || 
|- align="center"
|40||T||January 5, 2003||1–1 OT || align="left"| Dallas Stars ||15–15–7–3 || 
|- align="center" bgcolor="#FFBBBB"
|41||L||January 8, 2003||0–1 || align="left"| Edmonton Oilers ||15–16–7–3 || 
|- align="center" bgcolor="#CCFFCC"
|42||W||January 9, 2003||5–3 || align="left"| @ Colorado Avalanche ||16–16–7–3 || 
|- align="center" bgcolor="#CCFFCC"
|43||W||January 12, 2003||2–1 || align="left"| St. Louis Blues ||17–16–7–3 || 
|- align="center" bgcolor="#CCFFCC"
|44||W||January 15, 2003||4–3 || align="left"| @ Columbus Blue Jackets ||18–16–7–3 || 
|- align="center" bgcolor="#FFBBBB"
|45||L||January 16, 2003||1–3 || align="left"| @ Ottawa Senators ||18–17–7–3 || 
|- align="center" bgcolor="#CCFFCC"
|46||W||January 18, 2003||1–0 || align="left"| @ Minnesota Wild ||19–17–7–3 || 
|- align="center" bgcolor="#FF6F6F"
|47||OTL||January 20, 2003||1–2 OT || align="left"| Minnesota Wild ||19–17–7–4 || 
|- align="center" bgcolor="#CCFFCC"
|48||W||January 22, 2003||6–5 || align="left"| Los Angeles Kings ||20–17–7–4 || 
|- align="center" bgcolor="#FFBBBB"
|49||L||January 24, 2003||1–3 || align="left"| New Jersey Devils ||20–18–7–4 || 
|- align="center" bgcolor="#CCFFCC"
|50||W||January 29, 2003||3–2 || align="left"| Ottawa Senators ||21–18–7–4 || 
|- align="center" bgcolor="#CCFFCC"
|51||W||January 30, 2003||4–3 || align="left"| @ San Jose Sharks ||22–18–7–4 || 
|-

|- align="center" bgcolor="#CCFFCC"
|52||W||February 4, 2003||3–2 || align="left"| @ Calgary Flames ||23–18–7–4 || 
|- align="center" bgcolor="#FFBBBB"
|53||L||February 5, 2003||1–2 || align="left"| @ Edmonton Oilers ||23–19–7–4 || 
|- align="center" bgcolor="#CCFFCC"
|54||W||February 7, 2003||3–2 || align="left"| Phoenix Coyotes ||24–19–7–4 || 
|- align="center" bgcolor="#CCFFCC"
|55||W||February 9, 2003||2–1 || align="left"| Carolina Hurricanes ||25–19–7–4 || 
|- align="center" bgcolor="#CCFFCC"
|56||W||February 12, 2003||4–3 OT || align="left"| Calgary Flames ||26–19–7–4 || 
|- align="center" bgcolor="#CCFFCC"
|57||W||February 14, 2003||4–2 || align="left"| @ Dallas Stars ||27–19–7–4 || 
|- align="center" bgcolor="#FFBBBB"
|58||L||February 15, 2003||1–2 || align="left"| @ Nashville Predators ||27–20–7–4 || 
|- align="center"
|59||T||February 17, 2003||2–2 OT || align="left"| New York Islanders ||27–20–8–4 || 
|- align="center" bgcolor="#CCFFCC"
|60||W||February 19, 2003||2–0 || align="left"| Columbus Blue Jackets ||28–20–8–4 || 
|- align="center" bgcolor="#FFBBBB"
|61||L||February 21, 2003||2–6 || align="left"| New York Rangers ||28–21–8–4 || 
|- align="center" bgcolor="#CCFFCC"
|62||W||February 23, 2003||4–0 || align="left"| @ Carolina Hurricanes ||29–21–8–4 || 
|- align="center" bgcolor="#FFBBBB"
|63||L||February 25, 2003||0–2 || align="left"| @ Tampa Bay Lightning ||29–22–8–4 || 
|- align="center" bgcolor="#CCFFCC"
|64||W||February 26, 2003||2–1 || align="left"| @ Florida Panthers ||30–22–8–4 || 
|- align="center" bgcolor="#FFBBBB"
|65||L||February 28, 2003||1–3 || align="left"| @ Phoenix Coyotes ||30–23–8–4 || 
|-

|- align="center" bgcolor="#FFBBBB"
|66||L||March 2, 2003||1–4 || align="left"| Atlanta Thrashers ||30–24–8–4 || 
|- align="center" bgcolor="#CCFFCC"
|67||W||March 4, 2003||2–1 || align="left"| @ Los Angeles Kings ||31–24–8–4 || 
|- align="center" bgcolor="#CCFFCC"
|68||W||March 5, 2003||3–1 || align="left"| Montreal Canadiens ||32–24–8–4 || 
|- align="center" bgcolor="#FFBBBB"
|69||L||March 7, 2003||1–4 || align="left"| Edmonton Oilers ||32–25–8–4 || 
|- align="center" bgcolor="#CCFFCC"
|70||W||March 9, 2003||4–1 || align="left"| Detroit Red Wings ||33–25–8–4 || 
|- align="center" bgcolor="#CCFFCC"
|71||W||March 12, 2003||5–2 || align="left"| Chicago Blackhawks ||34–25–8–4 || 
|- align="center" bgcolor="#CCFFCC"
|72||W||March 13, 2003||3–2 OT || align="left"| San Jose Sharks ||35–25–8–4 || 
|- align="center" bgcolor="#FFBBBB"
|73||L||March 15, 2003||2–4 || align="left"| @ Phoenix Coyotes ||35–26–8–4 || 
|- align="center"
|74||T||March 16, 2003||2–2 OT || align="left"| Calgary Flames ||35–26–9–4 || 
|- align="center" bgcolor="#CCFFCC"
|75||W||March 19, 2003||4–3 || align="left"| @ Chicago Blackhawks ||36–26–9–4 || 
|- align="center" bgcolor="#FF6F6F"
|76||OTL||March 20, 2003||2–3 OT || align="left"| @ St. Louis Blues ||36–26–9–5 || 
|- align="center" bgcolor="#CCFFCC"
|77||W||March 22, 2003||3–2 OT || align="left"| @ San Jose Sharks ||37–26–9–5 || 
|- align="center" bgcolor="#CCFFCC"
|78||W||March 24, 2003||5–0 || align="left"| Columbus Blue Jackets ||38–26–9–5 || 
|- align="center" bgcolor="#CCFFCC"
|79||W||March 30, 2003||3–1 || align="left"| Vancouver Canucks ||39–26–9–5 || 
|-

|- align="center" bgcolor="#CCFFCC"
|80||W||April 1, 2003||2–1 OT || align="left"| @ Nashville Predators ||40–26–9–5 || 
|- align="center" bgcolor="#FFBBBB"
|81||L||April 2, 2003||1–2 || align="left"| @ Dallas Stars ||40–27–9–5 || 
|- align="center" bgcolor="#FF6F6F"
|82||OTL||April 4, 2003||3–4 OT || align="left"| Colorado Avalanche ||40–27–9–6 || 
|-

|-
| Legend:

Playoffs

|- align="center" bgcolor="#CCFFCC"
| 1 ||W|| April 10, 2003 || 2–1 3OT || align="left"| @ Detroit Red Wings || Mighty Ducks lead 1–0 || 
|- align="center" bgcolor="#CCFFCC"
| 2 ||W|| April 12, 2003 || 3–2 || align="left"|@ Detroit Red Wings || Mighty Ducks lead 2–0 || 
|- align="center" bgcolor="#CCFFCC"
| 3 ||W|| April 14, 2003 || 2–1 || align="left"| Detroit Red Wings || Mighty Ducks lead 3–0 || 
|- align="center" bgcolor="#CCFFCC"
| 4 ||W|| April 16, 2003 || 3–2 OT || align="left"| Detroit Red Wings || Mighty Ducks win 4–0 || 
|-

|- align="center" bgcolor="#CCFFCC"
| 1 ||W|| April 24, 2003 || 4–3 5OT || align="left"| @ Dallas Stars || Mighty Ducks lead 1–0 || 
|- align="center" bgcolor="#CCFFCC"
| 2 ||W|| April 26, 2003 || 3–2 OT || align="left"| @ Dallas Stars || Mighty Ducks lead 2–0 || 
|- align="center" bgcolor="#FFBBBB"
| 3 ||L|| April 28, 2003 || 1–2 || align="left"| Dallas Stars || Mighty Ducks lead 2–1 || 
|- align="center" bgcolor="#CCFFCC"
| 4 ||W|| April 30, 2003 || 1–0 || align="left"| Dallas Stars || Mighty Ducks lead 3–1 || 
|- align="center" bgcolor="#FFBBBB"
| 5 ||L|| May 3, 2003 || 1–4 || align="left"|@ Dallas Stars || Mighty Ducks lead 3–2 || 
|- align="center" bgcolor="#CCFFCC"
| 6 ||W|| May 5, 2003 || 4–3 || align="left"| Dallas Stars || Mighty Ducks win 4–2 || 
|-

|- align="center" bgcolor="#CCFFCC"
| 1 ||W|| May 10, 2003 || 1–0 2OT || align="left"|@ Minnesota Wild || Mighty Ducks lead 1–0 || 
|- align="center" bgcolor="#CCFFCC"
| 2 ||W|| May 12, 2003 || 2–0 || align="left"| @ Minnesota Wild || Mighty Ducks lead 2–0 || 
|- align="center" bgcolor="#CCFFCC"
| 3 ||W|| May 14, 2003 || 4–0 || align="left"| Minnesota Wild || Mighty Ducks lead 3–0 || 
|- align="center" bgcolor="#CCFFCC"
| 4 ||W|| May 16, 2003 || 2–1 || align="left"| Minnesota Wild || Mighty Ducks win 4–0 || 
|-

|- align="center" bgcolor="#FFBBBB"
| 1 ||L|| May 27, 2003 || 0–3 || align="left"|@ New Jersey Devils || Devils lead 1–0 || 
|- align="center" bgcolor="#FFBBBB"
| 2 ||L|| May 29, 2003 || 0–3 || align="left"| @ New Jersey Devils || Devils lead 2–0 || 
|- align="center" bgcolor="#CCFFCC"
| 3 ||W|| May 31, 2003 || 3–2 OT || align="left"| New Jersey Devils || Devils lead 2–1 || 
|- align="center" bgcolor="#CCFFCC"
| 4 ||W|| June 2, 2003 || 1–0 OT || align="left"| New Jersey Devils || Series tied 2–2 || 
|- align="center" bgcolor="#FFBBBB"
| 5 ||L|| June 5, 2003 || 3–6 || align="left"|@ New Jersey Devils || Devils lead 3–2 || 
|- align="center" bgcolor="#CCFFCC"
| 6 ||W|| June 7, 2003 || 5–2 || align="left"| New Jersey Devils || Series tied 3–3 || 
|- align="center" bgcolor="#FFBBBB"
| 7 ||L|| June 9, 2003 || 0–3 || align="left"| @ New Jersey Devils || Devils win 4–3 || 
|-

|-
| Legend:

Player statistics

Scoring
 Position abbreviations: C = Center; D = Defense; G = Goaltender; LW = Left Wing; RW = Right Wing
  = Joined team via a transaction (e.g., trade, waivers, signing) during the season. Stats reflect time with the Mighty Ducks only.
  = Left team via a transaction (e.g., trade, waivers, release) during the season. Stats reflect time with the Mighty Ducks only.

Goaltending

Awards and records

Awards

Milestones

Transactions
The Mighty Ducks were involved in the following transactions from June 14, 2002, the day after the deciding game of the 2002 Stanley Cup Finals, through June 9, 2003, the day of the deciding game of the 2003 Stanley Cup Finals.

Trades

Players acquired

Players lost

Signings

Draft picks
Anaheim's picks at the 2002 NHL Entry Draft in Toronto, Ontario.

Farm teams
 The Mighty Ducks farm team was the Cincinnati Mighty Ducks of the American Hockey League. The team finished third in the Central Division with a record of 26-35-13-6.

See also
2002–03 NHL season

Notes

References

Anaheim Ducks seasons
Anaheim
Anaheim
Western Conference (NHL) championship seasons
Anaheim
Mighty Ducks of Anaheim
Mighty Ducks of Anaheim